Rajivnagar is a large village located in Zawlnuam of Mamit district, Mizoram with total 708 families residing. The Rajivnagar village has population of 3530 of which 1796 are males while 1734 are females as per Population Census 2011. Rajiv nagar also known as Aamsury is an important business center for local Chakma people.

In Rajivnagar village population of children with age 0-6 is 703 which makes up 19.92 % of total population of village. Average Sex Ratio of Rajivnagar village is 965 which is lower than Mizoram state average of 976. Child Sex Ratio for the Rajivnagar as per census is 1099, higher than Mizoram average of 970.

Rajivnagar village has low literacy rate compared with Mizoram. In 2011, literacy rate of Rajivnagar village was 48.60 % compared with 91.33 % of Mizoram. In Rajivnagar Male literacy stands at 63.11 % while female literacy rate was 33.09 %.

As per constitution of India and Panchyati Raaj Act, Rajivnagar village is administrated by Sarpanch (Head of Village) who is elected representative of village.

References

Villages in Dharwad district